Vasuki is a serpent king in Hindu and Buddhist mythology. Vasuki may also refer to:

 Vasuki (wife of Valluvar), the wife of the Tamil poet Valluvar
 Vasuki Sunkavalli, Miss Universe India 2011
 Vasuki Bhaskar, Indian fashion and costume designer
 Vasuki (film), a 1997 Tamil-language Indian film
 Puthiya Niyamam 2016 Malayalam film dubbed into tamil and telugu as Vasuki